Papal Seminary, Pune, India, is a Catholic educational institute whose primary function is training priests. Currently, it caters to the formation of about 180 Seminarians from most of the dioceses of India. It trains students from all three ritual Churches of India: Latin rite, Syro-Malabar rite and Syro-Malankara Rite.

History

Founding 
Pope Leo XIII established the Papal Seminary for India, Burma and Ceylon in 1890. The task of finding a suitable place for the Papal Seminary was entrusted to Msgr. Ladislaus Zaleski. Subsequently, Msgr. Zaleski became the Apostolic Delegate to India, Burma and Ceylon and took up residence in Kandy. After travelling within India and Sri Lanka (then called Ceylon), he chose to locate the seminary in Ampitiya, a settlement close to Kandy. Zaleski insisted that the seminary be entrusted to the Jesuit Missionaries of the Belgian province (at work in the Bengal Mission).

The students were selected from the dioceses of India and Sri Lanka, and were to be trained as leaders of the Churches in their own countries. This was one of the first major seminaries to be supported by the Pontifical Society of St. Peter the Apostle. 

The seminary opened its doors in 1893 under the rectorship of Rev. Sylvain Grosjean, then Rector of St Xavier's School, Calcutta.

In 1926 the seminary was empowered by Rome to confer Ecclesiastical degrees in Philosophy and Theology.  

During its 62 years of existence in Kandy, over 700 students were ordained to the priesthood, among whom 51 became bishops and 3 became cardinals.

1955: Transfer to Pune, India 
The seminary moved to Pune in 1955. The transfer of the Papal Seminary to India was driven by financial and traveling difficulties; the independence of India in 1947 and the consequent political separation of India and Sri Lanka made it difficult for Indian seminarians to travel to Kandy. 

The new buildings for the seminary were designed by architect Silvio Galizia.

The original seminary in Kandy became the National Seminary of Our Lady of Lanka for the now independent Sri Lanka.

1956 to 2000 
On February 10 1986 Pope John Paul II visited the Papal Seminary.

On December 16 1993 Mother Teresa visited the seminary.

Current day 
The students of Papal Seminary have their spiritual and human formation at the seminary. The academic formation is taken care of the sister-institution Jnana Deepa, Institute of Philosophy and Theology, Pune, which is on the same campus. 

The seminary has 16 staff members, both Jesuit and Diocesan priests. It has three spiritual directors who looks into the human dimension of the formation of the seminarians. The house doctor, Manoj Durairaj, received the Pro Ecclesia et Pontifice.

In 2015 the seminary celebrated 60 years in Pune.

Rectors of Papal Seminary 
 Rev Fr Bhausaheb  Sansare SJ (03 Dec 2017)
 Rev Fr Jose Thayil SJ (Jun 2010 – Dec 2017)
 Rev Fr Pradeep Sequeira SJ
 Rev Fr. Ornellas Coutinho SJ
 Rev Fr Joe Mathias SJ
 Rev Fr Michael Alosanai SJ
 Rev Fr Joe Thadavanal SJ

Notable Faculty 
 Kurien Kunnumpuram
 Francis Pereira

Notable Alumni 

 Mar Varghese Payyappilly Palakkappilly

See Also 

 List of Jesuit sites

References 

Christian seminaries and theological colleges in India
1893 establishments in India
Educational institutions established in 1893